The SNCF Class A1AA1A 68000 is a class of diesel-electric locomotives of the SNCF. Originally a class of 80 locomotives, they were built for both passenger and freight service. They were ordered on 7 June 1961, the first entering service on 13 December 1963 at Chalindrey depot. A further 5 were added by refitting members of the similar AGO powered Class A1AA1A 68500 with Sulzer engines, thought to be those formerly used in the BR Class 48 locomotives, D1702–1706. Subsequently, 13 members of the class were rebuilt as Class A1AA1A 68500, 1 in 1963 and 12 in 1993. The last was withdrawn from traffic in 2005, with the exception of 68081 which has been preserved at the Cité du Train.

References

Further reading

 

A1A-A1A locomotives
A1AA1a 68000
Railway locomotives introduced in 1963
68000
Standard gauge locomotives of France